The men's rings competition was one of eight events for male competitors in artistic gymnastics at the 1960 Summer Olympics in Rome. It was held on 5, 7, and 10 September at the Baths of Caracalla. There were 129 competitors from 28 nations, with nations in the team competition having up to 6 gymnasts and other nations entering up to 2 gymnasts. The event was won by Albert Azaryan of the Soviet Union, the first man to successfully defend an Olympic title in the rings. Boris Shakhlin took silver, making it the third consecutive Games the Soviets finished in the top two. Takashi Ono tied with Velik Kapsazov for bronze, giving Japan its second consecutive Games with at least one bronze medal (there had been a tie for third in 1956 as well, between two Japanese gymnasts that time) and Bulgaria its first medal in the rings.

The 1960 gymnastics competitions introduced apparatus finals, with the all-around competition serving as a qualifying round for the rings final.

Background

This was the 10th appearance of the event, which is one of the five apparatus events held every time there were apparatus events at the Summer Olympics (no apparatus events were held in 1900, 1908, 1912, or 1920). Six of the top 11 (including ties for 10th) gymnasts from 1956 returned: gold medalist Albert Azaryan and tenth-place finisher Yury Titov of the Soviet Union, bronze medalist Masao Takemoto and fifth-place finishers Takashi Ono and Nobuyuki Aihara of Japan, and ninth-place finisher Ferdinand Daniš of Czechoslovakia. Azaryan, Aihara, and Titov had comprised the podium in the 1958 world championships.

Morocco and South Korea each made their debut in the men's rings; the short-lived United Arab Republic made its only appearance. The United States made its ninth appearance, most of any nation, having missed only the inaugural 1896 Games.

Competition format

The gymnastics all-around events continued to use the aggregation format. Each nation entered a team of six gymnasts or up to two individual gymnasts. All entrants in the gymnastics competitions performed both a compulsory exercise and a voluntary exercise for each apparatus. The scores for all 12 exercises were summed to give an individual all-around score.

These exercise scores were also used for qualification for the new apparatus finals. The two exercises (compulsory and voluntary) for each apparatus were summed to give an apparatus score; the top 6 in each apparatus participated in the finals; others were ranked 7th through 129th. For the apparatus finals, the all-around score for that apparatus was multiplied by one-half then added to the final round exercise score to give a final total.

Exercise scores ranged from 0 to 10, with the final total apparatus score from 0 to 20.

Schedule

All times are Central European Time (UTC+1)

Results

References

Official Olympic Report
www.gymnasticsresults.com
www.gymn-forum.net

Men's rings
Men's 1960
Men's events at the 1960 Summer Olympics